Puerto Rico Senatorial District V, also known as the Senatorial District of Ponce, is one of the eight senatorial districts of Puerto Rico. It is currently represented by Marially González Huertas and Ramón Ruiz Nieves (both from the Popular Democratic Party).

District profile

The Senatorial District V has an approximate population of 464,962. It covers the following municipalities:
 Adjuntas
 Guánica
 Guayanilla
 Jayuya
 Lajas
 Lares
 Maricao
 Peñuelas
 Ponce
 Sabana Grande
 Utuado
 Yauco
 and some regions of Juana Díaz

In previous distributions, the territory covered by the Senatorial District V has changed. In 1972, the District didn't include the municipality of Jayuya, which was annexed during the 1983 redistribution. Also, in 1972 and 1983 the District didn't include the municipalities of Lajas, Maricao or Juana Díaz. However, in the 1991 redistribution, both Lajas and Maricao were assigned to the district.

The district didn't suffer changes in the redistribution of 2002, but some regions of Juana Díaz were added in the redistribution of 2011.

Election results

2012

|-
! style="background-color:#FF0000" |
| style="width: 130px" | Popular Democratic Party (PPD)
|               | Ramón Ruiz
| 113,499
| 24.43
| 
|-
! style="background-color:#FF0000" |
| style="width: 130px" | Popular Democratic Party (PPD)
|               | Martín Vargas Morales
| 112,974
| 24.32
| 
|-
! style="background-color:#0080FF" |
| style="width: 130px" | New Progressive Party (PNP)
|               | Luis Berdiel
| 111,806
| 24.07
| -1.44
|-
! style="background-color:#0080FF" |
| style="width: 130px" | New Progressive Party (PNP)
|               | Eliezer Velázquez
| 111,454
| 23.99
| 
|-
! style="background-color:#01DF3A" |
| style="width: 130px" | Puerto Rican Independence Party (PIP)
|               | Luis Enrique Martínez
| 6,246
| 1.34
| 
|-
! style="background-color:#01DF3A" |
| style="width: 130px" | Puerto Rican Independence Party (PIP)
|               | Javier Maldonado Mercado
| 5,972
| 1.29
|

2008

|-
! style="background-color:#0080FF" |
| style="width: 130px" | New Progressive Party (PNP)
|               | Larry Seilhamer
| 116,666
| 25.69%
| 
|-
! style="background-color:#0080FF" |
| style="width: 130px" | New Progressive Party (PNP)
|               | Luis Berdiel
| 115,857
| 25.51
| 
|-
! style="background-color:#FF0000" |
| style="width: 130px" | Popular Democratic Party (PPD)
|               | Rafael Santiago Pereles
| 102,316
| 22.53
| 
|-
! style="background-color:#FF0000" |
| style="width: 130px" | Popular Democratic Party (PPD)
|               | José Luis Galarza
| 101,509
| 22.35
| 
|-
! style="background-color:#01DF3A" |
| style="width: 130px" | Puerto Rican Independence Party (PIP)
|               | Luis E. Rodríguez Santiago
| 5,243
| 1.15
| 
|-
! style="background-color:#01DF3A" |
| style="width: 130px" | Puerto Rican Independence Party (PIP)
|               | Oscar Castellón
| 5,062
| 1.11
| 
|-
! style="background-color:#FFBF00" |
| style="width: 130px" | Puerto Ricans for Puerto Rico Party (PPR)
|               | Raúl Morris
| 4,704
| 1.04
|

2004

|-
! style="background-color:#FF0000" |
| style="width: 130px" | Popular Democratic Party (PPD)
|               | Modesto Agosto Alicea
| 115,866
| 24.60%
| -0.70
|-
! style="background-color:#FF0000" |
| style="width: 130px" | Popular Democratic Party (PPD)
|               | Bruno Ramos
| 115,302
| 24.48
| -0.62
|-
! style="background-color:#0080FF" |
| style="width: 130px" | New Progressive Party (PNP)
|               | María "Mayita" Meléndez
| 109,322
| 23.21
| 
|-
! style="background-color:#0080FF" |
| style="width: 130px" | New Progressive Party (PNP)
|               | Linnette Toledo
| 108,846
| 23.11
| 
|-
! style="background-color:#01DF3A" |
| style="width: 130px" | Puerto Rican Independence Party (PIP)
|               | Myrna Rodríguez Lugo
| 9,823
| 2.09
| 
|-
! style="background-color:#01DF3A" |
| style="width: 130px" | Puerto Rican Independence Party (PIP)
|               | Luis Varela Ortíz
| 9,578
| 2.03
|

References

External links
Distribución de Distritos Senatoriales de Puerto Rico

Puerto Rico Senatorial districts